Solomon Popoli Linda (19098 September 1962), also known as Solomon Ntsele ("Linda" was his clan name), was a South African musician, singer and composer best known as the composer of the song "Mbube", which later became the pop music success "The Lion Sleeps Tonight", and gave its name to the Mbube style of isicathamiya a cappella later popularized by Ladysmith Black Mambazo.

Early years 
Solomon Popoli Linda was born near Pomeroy, on the labor reserve Msinga, Umzinyathi District Municipality in Ladysmith in Natal, where he was familiar with the traditions of amahubo and izingoma zomshado (wedding songs) music. He attended the Gordon Memorial mission school, where he learned about Western musical culture, hymns, and participated in choir contests. 

In 1931, Linda, like many other young African men at that time, left his homestead to find menial work in Johannesburg, by then a sprawling gold-mining town with a great demand for cheap labour. He worked in the Mayi Mayi Furniture Shop on Small Street and sang in a choir known as the Evening Birds, managed by his uncles, Solomon and Amon Madondo, and which disbanded in 1933.

Linda found employment at Johannesburg's Carlton Hotel and started a new group that retained the Evening Birds name. The members of the group were Solomon Linda (soprano), Gilbert Madondo (alto), Boy Sibiya (tenor), with Gideon Mkhize, Samuel Mlangeni, and Owen Sikhakhane as basses. They were all Linda's friends from Pomeroy.
 
The group evolved from performances at weddings to choir competitions. Linda's musical popularity grew with the Evening Birds, who presented "a very cool urban act that wears pinstriped suits, bowler hats and dandy two-tone shoes".

"Mbube"

After Linda started working at the Gallo Record Company's Roodepoort plant in 1938 as a record packer, the Evening Birds were witnessed by company talent scout Griffith Motsieloa.

Italian immigrant Eric Gallo owned what at that time was sub-Saharan Africa's only recording studio. In 1939, while recording a number of songs in the studio, Linda improvised the song "Mbube" (Lion). "Mbube" was a major success for Linda and the Evening Birds, reportedly selling more than 100,000 copies in South Africa by 1949. The recording was produced by Motsieloa at the Gallo Recording Studios, in Johannesburg. Unconsciously, Linda sold the rights to Gallo Record Company for 10 shillings (less than US$2) soon after the recording was made.
 
In 1948, the Evening Birds disbanded, and a year later Linda married Regina. While raising a family he continued to perform. His song "Mbube" had made him well known in South Africa. Linda is credited with a number of musical innovations that came to dominate the isicathamiya style. Instead of using one singer per voice part, the Evening Birds used a number of bass singers. He introduced the falsetto main voice, which incorporated female vocal texture into male singing. His group was the first known to use striped suits to indicate that they were urban sophisticates. At the same time, their bass singing retained some musical elements indicative of traditional choral music.
 
Some of Linda's music can be interpreted as expressing political dissent. For example, "Yethulisgqoko" ("Take off your hat", Gallo GE 887) recalls treatment by Pass Office officials, and ends with the words "Sikhalela izwe lakithi" ("We cry for our country"). Such expressions were an occasional feature of Mbube songs. Groups such as The Alexandrians were associated with the Industrial and Commercial Workers Union in Johannesburg.

Alan Lomax
The original South African recording was discovered during the early 1950s by American musicologist Alan Lomax, who gave it to his friend, folk musician Pete Seeger of The Weavers. Seeger retitled it "Wimoweh", an approximate phonetic rendering of the song's Zulu language refrain, "uyimbube" ("you are a lion", from "u-" ["you"], "yi-" ["are"] and "imbube" ["lion"]), and it was introduced to America by The Weavers; they recorded a studio version in 1952 which became a Top 20 hit in the US, as well as an influential live version recorded at Carnegie Hall in 1955 and released in April 1957. The Weavers' version was subsequently covered by The Kingston Trio in 1959.
 
The Weavers' Carnegie Hall version was also the inspiration for the 1961 version recorded by popular music group The Tokens, for whom English lyrics were written by George David Weiss and retitled "The Lion Sleeps Tonight"; this is the version most often played on popular radio today. (However, at the time, 1961–62, a fast-tempo version by the Karl Denver Trio was the more successful in the UK.)

Illness and death
During a performance in 1959, Linda collapsed. He was later diagnosed with kidney failure. His family suspected that he was bewitched by his musical rivals.

Despite the popularity and wide use of the song, Linda died impoverished in 1962 of kidney failure. It was not until 18 years later that a tombstone was constructed at his gravesite.

Rediscovery
In 2000, South African journalist Rian Malan wrote a feature article for the magazine Rolling Stone, describing Linda's story and estimating that the song had earned US$15 million for its use in The Lion King alone. Malan and the South African filmmaker François Verster cooperated to make a television documentary called A Lion's Trail that tells Solomon Linda's story, and which was screened by PBS. In 2004, with the backing of the South African government and Gallo Records, Linda's descendants in South Africa sued The Walt Disney Company for its use in The Lion King movie and stage musical without paying royalties to them. The story of the lawsuit against Disney and the aftermath of the settlement is told in the 2019 Netflix documentary, The Lion's Share.

Settlement
In February 2006, Linda's estate attained a legal settlement with Abilene Music company, which had the worldwide rights and had licensed the song to Disney. This settlement applies to worldwide rights, not just South African, since 1987. The proceeds of the settlement were placed into a trust, to be administered by SA Music Rights CEO Nick Motsatsi.

A trial was scheduled to start on 21 February 2006, but just before the trial, a settlement was reached between Linda's estate, Disney and Abilene Music Company, the true defendant of the litigation, who had granted an indemnity to Disney when it licensed use of "The Lion Sleeps Tonight" in The Lion King. The primary outcomes of the settlement were:

The estate was to receive payment for past uses of "The Lion Sleeps Tonight" and an entitlement to future royalties from its worldwide use.
"The Lion Sleeps Tonight" was to be acknowledged as derived from "Mbube".
Solomon Linda was to be acknowledged as a co-composer of "The Lion Sleeps Tonight" and to be designated as such in the future.
A trust was to be formed to administer the estate's copyright in "Mbube" and to receive on their behalf the payments due from the use of "The Lion Sleeps Tonight".

Partial discography 
During his musical career, Solomon Linda recorded many songs (some of them unissued) in the Gallo Recording Studio. He was accompanied by his vocal group, The Evening Birds.
 1938: Makasani/Mfo Ka Linda
 1938: Ngqo Ngqongo Vula/Ngi Boni Sebeni
 1939: Ntombi Ngangiyeshela (recorded c. 1938)/Hamba Pepa Lami
 1939: Yetulisigqoko
 1939: Mbube/Ngi Hambile (recorded c. 1938)
 1939: Sangena Mama/Sohlangana
 1939: Sengiyofela Pesheya/Ziyekele Mama
 1940: Jerusalema (recorded c. 1940)/Basibizalonkizwe
 1940: Sigonde 'Mnambiti (recorded c. 1939)/Bhamporo
 1942: Ngazula Emagumeni (recorded c. 1941)/Gijima Mfana
 1942: Ndaba Zika Linda/Ngiyomutshel'Ubaba

References

External links
PBS: The Lion's Trail
The World: Global Hit: Solomon Linda

"Groundbreaking SA lawsuit sends a message to the world’s cultural power-brokers", SA Music News, Thursday, 16 February 2006.
Mark Steyn, The Lion Sleeps Tonight.

Media
 Sample of "Mbube" performed by Solomon Linda's "Original Evening Birds" (opens directly in a WMA-compatible media player].
 Scanned image of Linda's original Gallotone recording.

1909 births
1962 deaths
Deaths from kidney failure
People from Umzinyathi District Municipality
Zulu people
South African male composers
20th-century South African male singers
20th-century South African musicians
20th-century composers